The 24th British Academy Scotland Awards were held on 16 November 2014 at the Radisson Blu Hotel in Glasgow, honouring the best Scottish film and television productions of 2013.  Presented by BAFTA Scotland, accolades are handed out for the best in feature-length film that were screened at British cinemas during 2013. The Nominees were announced on 23 October 2014. The ceremony was broadcast online via YouTube and was hosted by Hazel Irvine.

Tommy Gormley, Alex Graham and Lorraine Kelly were honoured with Outstanding Contribution awards at this ceremony.

Winners and nominees

Winners are listed first and highlighted in boldface.

Outstanding Contribution to Television
Lorraine Kelly

Outstanding Contribution to Craft
Tommy Gormley

Outstanding Contribution to Broadcasting
Alex Graham

See also
BAFTA Scotland
67th British Academy Film Awards
86th Academy Awards
20th Screen Actors Guild Awards
34th Golden Raspberry Awards

References

External links
BAFTA Scotland Home page

2014
2014 in British cinema 
2014 in British television
British
British
2014 in Scotland
2010s in Glasgow
Brit
November 2014 events in the United Kingdom